Jan Popowicz (born 5 January 1948) is a Polish archer. He competed in the men's individual event at the 1976 Summer Olympics.

References

1948 births
Living people
Polish male archers
Olympic archers of Poland
Archers at the 1976 Summer Olympics
People from Rzeszów